The Voice , known in English as The Voice Georgia, is a Georgian reality television show and singing competition broadcast on 1TV.
 
From seasons one through three, the show was called The Voice of Georgia and was broadcast on IMEDI TV. It is part of the international franchise The Voice based on the reality singing competition The Voice of Holland, launched in the Netherlands, created by Dutch television producer John de Mol.

One of the show's important premises is the contestants' singing quality. Four coaches, themselves popular performing artists, composers, and producers, train talents in their team and occasionally perform with them. Talents are selected in blind auditions, where the coaches cannot see, but only hear the auditioner.

History
The first season kicked off on 4 October 2012 and finished on 13 January 2013. The winner of the first season was Salome Katamadze with 48.6% of the votes. She was awarded a trip to Los Angeles, California to record a single at Universal Music Studio.

In 2013, IMEDI TV produced a kids' version of the show titled . The coaches were Dato Porchkhidze, Eka Kakhiani, and Stephane Mgebrishvili, with Samory Balde and Ruska Makashvili as the presenters.

Starting in 2021, the show was rebooted by the channel 1TV. It will be used to select the Georgian representative for the Eurovision Song Contest 2023.

Format 
The show consists of three phases: blind auditions, battles phase, and live performance shows. Four coaches, all noteworthy recording artists, choose teams of contestants through a blind audition process. Each coach has the length of the auditioner's performance (about one minute and a half) to decide if they want that performer on their team; if two or more coaches want the same performer (as happens frequently), the performer has the final choice of which coach's team to join.

After each coach fills every slot in their team, the batch of singers in the team is mentored and developed by their respective coach. In the second stage, called the battles phase, coaches have to pair their team members to battle against each other directly by singing the same song together on a stage that looks like a battle ring. The coach chooses the winner of each battle, who goes into the first live round.

Within the live shows, the surviving acts from each team compete head-to-head, with the public vote determining who will advance to the next episode. Finally, between the remaining acts, the coach chooses one to advance. In the finale, the outcome is decided solely by public vote.

Coaches and presenters

Coaches' timeline

Presenters' timeline

Series overview 
Warning: the following table presents a significant amount of different colors.

 Notes

Seasons synopsis

Season 1 (2012–2013) 
The first season of The Voice of Georgia started on 4 October 2012 and it was hosted by Duta Skhirtladze and Anna Imedashvili. There were six episodes of Blind auditions, four episodes of Battles, and six Live shows.

Season 2 (2013–2014)
Season two started in October 2013, in Imedi TV. The coaches were Dato Porchkhidze, Lela Tsurtsumia, Maia Darsmelidze, and Stephane. The winner of the season was Mariam Chachkhiani from Team Dato.

Season 3 (2015–2016)
The auditions for season three began in the summer of 2015. Season three kicked off on Imedi TV in October 2015.

Season 4 (2021)
In 2020, a reboot of the series was announced and produced for the channel 1TV. The fourth season features returning coach Stephane Mgebrishvili and debutants Niaz Diasamidze, Salome Korkotashvili – better known as Salio – and Nikoloz Rachveli (addressed on the show as Nika). The Voice Kids host Ruska Makashvili returns as the presenter of the show. Recordings of the Blind auditions began on 31 January 2021, and the first episode aired on 20 February 2021.

Season 5 (2022–2023) 

Broadcaster 1TV announced the opening of applications for The Voice  season five on 23 August 2022, which would close on 20 September. With this announcement, the channel also revealed that the competition would be used to choose the Georgian representative for the Eurovision Song Contest 2023.

For the coaching panel, Stephane Mgebrishvili was the only coach returning from the previous season and Dato Porchkhidze returned after a two-season hiatus. Meanwhile, Sopo Toroshelidze and Dato Evgenidze debuted as coaches, and Gvantsa Daraselia debuted as the show's presenter. The season premiered on 8 December 2022.

Kids' version 
 aired from April 2013 until June 2013 on IMEDI TV. The hosts were Samory Balde and Ruska Makashvili and the coaches were Eka Kakhiani, Dato Porchkhidze, and Stephane Mgebrishvili.

References

External links 
The Voice  official website

 
Georgia (country)
2010s Georgia (country) television series
Music of Georgia (country)
2012 Georgia (country) television series debuts
Imedi TV original programming
Georgia (country) in the Eurovision Song Contest
Eurovision Song Contest selection events